Mineshaft may refer to:
 A long vertical tunnel giving access to a mine's workings, see shaft mining
 Mineshaft (gay club), a BDSM-oriented gay sex club in New York City, which operated from 1976 to 1985
 Mineshaft (horse), an American thoroughbred racehorse and successful stallion
 Mineshaft (magazine), an independent international art magazine, started in 1999
 Mineshaft gap
 Gemeinschaft